Mzab is a tribal confederation south of Casablanca in Morocco, part of the Chaouia. Part of the Mzab are Arabized Berber tribes, while the rest are Arab tribes of Banu Hilal. The Moroccan Mzab are not to be confused with the Algerian Berber tribe that has the same name (see M'zab). Mzab is Arabic for the Mozabite people.

Located in the historical breadbasket of Morocco (the Chaouia), Mzab's land is mostly used for wheat production, but is also famous for sheep husbandry (Sardy is the most common sheep race). Mzab's land is also nicknamed Al-'Alwa (Arabic: العلوة) which means height in Arabic because it's a plateau, which is part of the phosphate plateau that produces most of Morocco's highly prized mineral phosphate ore. The capital of Mzab is Ben Ahmed. 

Mzab is divided into many smaller tribes, the most important of which are:

Ben Ahmed (Capital)
Sidi Hajjaj
Hamdawa حمداوة
Oulad Mrah
Khzazra الخزازرة
Oulad Jabi
Oulad Fares اولاد فارس
Beni Brahim بني براهيم
Maarif المعاريف
Mkhalkhliya المخلخلية
Oulad Belbagi اولاد بلباجى 
Beni Arif  بني عريف

There was also a Jewish presence in Mzab, but all Jews left in the 1950s and 1960s, mostly to Israel. The Mellah الملاح and the Hajraat الحجرات (rocks in Arabic) still testify of this presence. Jewish tourists from amongst the Moroccan diaspora still visit the Hajraat sites every year. The site is a few kilometres from the Shrine of Sidi Mohamed El Fekkak, where an annual "Moussem" harvest festival is hosted.

References

External links 
 Tribus du Maroc - قبائل المغرب - Mzab
 Tribu & Origine
Arab tribes in Morocco
Arabized Berbers